This glossary of ichthyology is a list of definitions of terms and concepts used in ichthyology, the study of fishes.

A

B

C

D

E

F

G

H

I

J

K

L

M

N

O

P

R

S

T

U

V

W 

Fishkeeping
Ichthyology
Wikipedia glossaries using description lists